The International Academy for Systems and Cybernetic Sciences (IASCYS) is an honor society initially created by the International Federation for Systems Research (IFSR). The academy identifies outstanding scientists in systems and cybernetics and  elects them as academicians. The members of the Academy conduct workshops and speak at conferences about advances in the field.

Origin 
In 2010, the International Federation for Systems Research established an international non-profit association called The International Academy for Systems and Cybernetic Sciences. For 6 years the IASCYS was governed as an IFSR partner organization, but in 2016 it became an independent organization having its own statutes, rules of procedure and membership criteria.

Aims 
IASCYS was founded to honor and activate outstanding members of the systems and cybernetics community. The fields of systems and cybernetics emphasize a holistic perspective, thus we help people create points of view that describe more of the variety in the world, and thus our work bridges and fills the spaces between the descriptions from traditional sciences. Systems science and cybernetics, in both theory and application, facilitate transdisciplinary cooperation leading to insights into synergies and generalizations and the creation of methods for coping with situations that the traditional sciences fail to cover. Thus, the otherwise resulting oversights are replaced by new insights. These intellectual endeavors help people as individuals, their organizations, and humankind to attain a more complete appreciation, through perception, thinking, emotional and spiritual life, decision making, communication, and action, and therefore to attain more success and well being. Academicians are nominated by an association in the field. Biographies of IASCYS members are published on the IASCYS web-site.

Motivations 
National and international academies of sciences and arts previously did not include the contributions of systems and cybernetics in their list of sciences and arts. This situation overlooks the contributions which these fields have made to many traditional fields. IASCYS was created to build bridges among the member associations, to identify the most qualified scientists and practitioners in the field in order to invite them as keynote speakers to conferences, to recognize systems and cybernetics as sciences equal to other sciences, and to create links among the leading members of the systems and cybernetics community with the intent to aid and promote the development of these fields.

Intentions 
Two missions of the IASCYS are, through coordination of the actions of the member associations, to create an internationally accepted curriculum in systems and cybernetics and to create an auditing process aimed at validation and promotion of education in systems and cybernetics.

List of Academicians  

 Mary Catherine Bateson
 Ockert Bosch
 Pierre Bricage
 Soren Brier
 Pille Bunnel
 Tom R. Burns
 Xiaoqiang Cai
 Antonio Caselles Moncho
 Guang-ya Chen
 Hanfu Chen
 Jian Chen
 Philip Chen
 Tai Chu Edwin Cheng
 Gerhard Chroust
 Gerard de Zeeuw
 Georgi Dimirovski

 Jean-Pierre Dupuy
 Raul Espejo
 Charles François 
 Ranulph Glanville
 Jifa Gu
 Enrique Herrscher
 Wolfgang Hofkirchner
 Raymond Ison
 Michael Jackson
 Louis Kauffman
 Kyoichi Kijima
 Helena Knyazeva
 Klaus Krippendorff
 Kin Keung Lai
 Ervin László
 Vladimir Lefebvre

 Loet Leydesdorff
 Michael Lissack
 Humberto Maturana
 Edgar Morin
 Matjaž Mulej
 Karl H. Müller
 Yoshiteru Nakamori
 Nebojsa Nakicenovic
 Constantin Virgil Negoita
 Francisco Parra-Luna
 Jose Perez-Rios
 Larry Richards
 Markus Schwaninger
 Bernard Scott
 George Soros
 Robert Trappl

 Murray Turoff
 Stuart Umpleby
 Robert Vallée
 Ernst von Glasersfeld
 Shouyang Wang
 Kevin Warwick
 Andrzej P. Wierzbicki
 Jennifer Wilby
 Stephen Wolfram
 Jiuping Xu
 Xinmin Yang
 Ji-Feng Zhang
 Rainer E. Zimmerman

Geographical Distribution of the Academicians

External links 
 Official site
 International Federation for Systems Research
 World Organisation of Systems and Cybernetics
 European Union for Systemics/ Union Européenne de Systémique

References 

International academies
International scientific organizations
Scientific organizations established in 2010
Cybernetics
Cyberneticists